John Rogers Galvin (May 13, 1929 – September 25, 2015) was an American army general who served as the sixth dean of the Fletcher School of Law and Diplomacy at Tufts University and a member of the U.S. Commission on National Security/21st Century.

Career 
Galvin began his service as an enlisted soldier in the Massachusetts Army National Guard from 1947 to 1950 before he received an appointment to United States Military Academy at West Point, graduating in 1954 with a Bachelor of Science degree. In 1969, during the Vietnam War, lieutenant colonel Galvin commanded the 1st Battalion, 8th Cavalry Regiment, 1st Cavalry Division (Airmobile). For his actions as the battalion's commander he was awarded the Silver Star, the Distinguished Flying Cross and the Soldiers Medal.

He earned a Master of Arts degree in English from Columbia University in 1962 and later completed a fellowship at the Fletcher School of Law and Diplomacy in 1971.  Galvin served with the Army Combat Development Command, from 1970 to 1972, as a Military Assistant with Supreme Headquarters Allied Powers Europe (SHAPE), from 1974 to 1975 and commanded the 24th Infantry Division in the early 1980s.  He was promoted to lieutenant general and commanded the VII Corps in Germany from July 1983 to February 1985.

Galvin's career included the rare opportunity to command two different Department of Defense Unified Commands following his promotion to full (4-star) general. He served as Commander in Chief, United States Southern Command in Panama from 1985 to 1987 and Commander in Chief, United States European Command from June 26, 1987, to June 23, 1992. During his tenure as Commander U.S. European Command he also served as NATO's Supreme Allied Commander, Europe (SACEUR).

During his time as SACEUR many stay-behind networks in Europe were dismantled, a process that started with the revelations by Italy's then prime minister, Giulio Andreotti, who disclosed to the Italian Parliament the existence of a Gladio stay-behind anti-communist paramilitary network headed by NATO and present in most European countries.

Personal life
Galvin lived with his wife Ginny and had four daughters. One of his daughters, Beth, is a medical reporter for WAGA, the FOX affiliate in Atlanta.  The Galvin Middle School in Wakefield, Massachusetts, is named after him. The United States Military Academy awarded Galvin (Class of '54) the 1997 Distinguished Graduate Award. On September 25, 2015, he died in Jonesboro, Georgia at the age of 86.

Selected awards and decorations

 8th Cavalry Regiment Distinctive Unit Insignia

Bibliography

Galvin, John (2015). Fighting the Cold War: A Soldier's Memoir. Lexington, Kentucky: University Press of Kentucky.

See also
Notable graduates of West Point

References

External links
Interview with General Galvin from the Dean Peter Krogh Foreign Affairs Digital Archives
U.S. Commission on National Security "people" page
NATO biography

1929 births
2015 deaths
People from Wakefield, Massachusetts
Massachusetts National Guard personnel
United States Military Academy alumni
Columbia Graduate School of Arts and Sciences alumni
United States Army personnel of the Vietnam War
Recipients of the Air Medal
Recipients of the Soldier's Medal
Recipients of the Distinguished Flying Cross (United States)
Recipients of the Silver Star
The Fletcher School at Tufts University faculty
Recipients of the Legion of Merit
United States Army generals
Recipients of the Distinguished Service Medal (US Army)
NATO Supreme Allied Commanders
Recipients of the Defense Distinguished Service Medal
Grand Officiers of the Légion d'honneur
Knights Commander of the Order of Merit of the Federal Republic of Germany
Grand Crosses of Military Merit
Knights Grand Cross of the Order of Orange-Nassau
People from Jonesboro, Georgia
Burials at Arlington National Cemetery